Babaji Vidhyashram School is non-profit, independent, co-educational day school located in Old Mahabalipuram Road area of Chennai. BVS is affiliated to New Delhi-based, Central Board of Secondary Education.

Babaji Vidhyashram was founded in 2013. The school building was built in 9 months and the first academic year commenced in the April, 2015.

References 

Schools in Chennai
Educational institutions established in 2015
2015 establishments in Tamil Nadu